Anne Skelbæk (born 31 August 1990) is a Danish badminton player from the Værløse badminton club. In 2008, she has won some women's doubles title at the International Series tournament in Greece, Cyprus, and Czech Republic partnered with Maria Helsbøl. In 2010, she and Helsbøl also won the 2009–10 European Circuit Finals. Teamed-up with Anders Skaarup Rasmussen in the mixed doubles, they won the Dutch and Czech International Challenge tournament.

Achievements

BWF International Challenge/Series
Women's Doubles

Mixed Doubles

 BWF International Challenge tournament
 BWF International Series tournament

References

External links 

 

1990 births
Living people
Danish female badminton players